Lebetimonas natsushimae is a moderately thermophilic, strictly anaerobic and chemoautotrophic bacterium from the genus of Lebetimonas which has been isolated from a hydrothermal vent from the Mid-Okinawa Trough.

References

Bacteria genera
Bacteria described in 2017
Campylobacterota